Máire Ní Chathasaigh (born 1956) is an Irish harpist, composer and singer.

Biography
She was born in Bandon, County Cork, Ireland,  in a musical family. She learned to playthe  harp when she was eleven. She created new harp ornamentation techniques that made its stylistically accurate performance possible.  Having won All-Ireland (Fleadh Cheoil na hÉireann) harp competitions at under-fourteen and under-eighteen levels, she then, in the mid-1970s, won the Senior All-Ireland competition three years in succession. She also won the Pan-Celtic Harp Competition at junior and senior levels.

She was the 2001 recipient of TG4 Gradam Ceoil Ceoltóir na Bliana / Musician of the Year, awarded for "for the excellence and pioneering force of her music, the remarkable growth she has brought to the music of the harp and for the positive influence she has had on the young generation of harpers".

In 1985 she recorded The New-Strung Harp, the first harp album to concentrate primarily on traditional Irish dance music.  Her stylistic innovations made her famous in the Celtic music scene. 

Her partnership with English guitarist Chris Newman made its début on the main stage at the 1987 Cambridge Folk Festival. Since then they have toured as a duo all over Europe, North America, Australasia and Japan.

In 1988 they recorded The Living Wood, their first duo album, and since then they have recorded six further duo albums and a quartet album, Heartstring Sessions, with Ní Chathasaigh's sister Nollaig Casey and Nollaig's husband Arty McGlynn (all four toured together in Europe, North America and Australasia as the Heartstring Quartet). In 2015 Ní Chathasaigh recorded a trio album, Sibling Revelry, with her sisters Nollaig Casey and Mairéad Ní Chathasaigh. All albums were critically-acclaimed.

She features on the cover of the book Bringing It All Back Home and the June-July 2017 issue of Germany's Folk Magazin and of Comhaltas Ceoltóirí Éireann's magazine, Treoir. She and Chris Newman were featured on the cover, and in a article within, the April / May 2021 issue of The Living Tradition magazine.

She is profiled in Celtic Women in Music by Mairéad Sullivan, The Rough Guide to Irish Music and a number of magazine and newspaper articles.

A TV documentary programme about Ní Chathasaigh and her sister Nollaig (also featuring their sister Mairéad, together with Chris Newman and Nollaig's late husband Arty McGlynn) was originally broadcast on TG4 on November 29th, 2020, and re-broadcast 13 February, 2022, as part of its 'Sé mo Laoch series. It can currently be watched on the TG4 Player here.

Máire has been giving masterclasses and disseminating her ideas and techniques in Ireland, the UK, Europe, North America and Australasia since the mid-1970s.  Her arrangements have been published in two books, The Irish Harper Vols. I and II, and she has an honours degree in Celtic Studies from University College Cork.

Albums
The New Strung Harp (Temple Records, 1985)
The Living Wood (first released by Green Linnet, 1988; reissued by Black Crow 1989; re-mastered and reissued by Old Bridge Music 1995, OBMCD07)  - with guitarist Chris Newman
Out Of Court (Old Bridge Music OBMCD03, 1991) - with guitarist Chris Newman
The Carolan Albums (Old Bridge Music OBMCD06,1991) - with guitarist Chris Newman
Live In The Highlands (Old Bridge Music OBMCD08,1995) - with guitarist Chris Newman
Dialogues / Agallaimh (Old Bridge Music OBMCD014, 2001) - with guitarist Chris Newman
Firewire (Old Bridge Music OBMCD017, 2007) - with guitarist Chris Newman
Heartstring Sessions (Old Bridge Music OBMCD018, 2008) - with guitarist Chris Newman, fiddler / singer Nollaig Casey and guitarist Arty McGlynn
Christmas Lights (Old Bridge Music OBMCD20, 2013) - with guitarist Chris Newman
Sibling Revelry (Old Bridge Music OBMCD22, 2015) - with her sisters, fiddler / composer / singer Nollaig Casey and fiddler / singer Mairéad Ní Chathasaigh (The Casey Sisters)

Books
The Irish Harper (Vol. 1 and Vol. 2)

References

External links
Máire Ní Chathasaigh official solo site
Máire Ní Chathasaigh & Chris Newman official duo site
The Casey Sisters official site for Máire's trio with her sisters Nollaig Casey and Mairéad Ní Chathasaigh
The Heartstring Quartet official Heartstring Quartet (with Chris Newman, Nollaig Casey & Arty McGlynn) site
Old Bridge Music official label site

1956 births
Living people
Irish folk singers
Irish folk harpists
20th-century Irish women singers
Irish harpists
Musicians of New College, Oxford
Irish-language singers
21st-century Irish women singers